Roaring Creek is an unincorporated community in Avery County, North Carolina, United States. The community was named after Roaring Creek, which flows in the area.  The community is located along US 19-E, between the communities of Frank and Plumtree.

History
On September 27, 1780, the Overmountain Men, led by William Campbell, camped at Roaring Creek, after passing Yellow Mountain Gap; on October 7, 1780, they would arrive at Kings Mountain for the Battle of Kings Mountain against the British.

See also
 Big Yellow Mountain
 Grassy Ridge Bald
 Little Yellow Mountain
 North Toe River
 Overmountain Men
 Unaka Range

References

Further reading
 Cooper, Horton. History of Avery County,  Biltmore Press, 1964
 Cooper, Horton. North Carolina Mountain Folklore and Miscellany Murfreesboro, N.C., Johnson Pub. Co., c1972

Unincorporated communities in Avery County, North Carolina
Unincorporated communities in North Carolina